Devendranath Sharma (1918 - 1991) was a writer and scholar of Hindi Literature born in a Bhumihar Brahmin family of scholars. He was also a playwright and the Vice Chancellor of the Patna University.

List of works
He has authored:
 Hindi Bhasha ka Vikas
 Tulsi sahitya: vivechana aur mulyankan
 Bhashavigyan ki bhumika
 Pranam ki pradarshini mein (lalit nibandh)
 Alankar Muktavali
 Sahajaham ke amsu: chaha ekanki natak
 Mere shreshtha rang ekanki
 Nava ekanki: nadi pyasi thi
 Bhasha aur Bhasya: bhāshāvăijñanika nibãdha
 Amarabhāratī
 Khaṭṭā-mīṭhā
 Rāshṭrabhāshā Hindī, samasyāem̐ aura samādhāna
 Chāyāvāda aura pragativāda Hindī-Sāhitya-Parishad, Patna College dvārā āyojita sāhityika saptāha ke avasara para paṭhita nibandhoṃ kā saṅgraha
 Āīnā bola uṭhā, kalātmaka nibandhoṃ kā saṅkalana
  Brajabhāshā kī vibhūtiyām̐
 Sāhitya-samīkshā
  Pārijāta-mañjarī cāra maulika ekākī nāṭaka

See also
 List of Indian writers

Notes

Hindi-language writers
Indian male dramatists and playwrights
Indian literary critics
Indian male essayists
Writers from Patna
Dramatists and playwrights from Bihar
1918 births
1991 deaths
20th-century essayists